XHIDO-FM is a radio station on 100.5 FM in Tula, Hidalgo, Mexico, known as Super Stereo.

History
XHIDO received its concession on August 6, 1993. It was owned by Fernando Fernández y Almeda and broadcast originally on 90.9 MHz. Sometime after, it moved to 100.5 FM.

The station was known as Super Stereo until rebranding as Bandolera 100.5 FM, in the style of NRM's XEBS-AM 1410 in Mexico City, on August 14, 2019. This lasted three years before the Super Stereo name was restored on September 1, 2022.

References

1993 establishments in Mexico
Radio stations in Hidalgo (state)
Radio stations established in 1993
Regional Mexican radio stations
Spanish-language radio stations